Carmarthen Town Association Football Club is a Welsh semi-professional football club based in Carmarthen. The team play their home games at Richmond Park. The club colours, reflected in their crest and kit, are gold and black.
Formed in 1950, Carmarthen Town was elected into the Welsh Football League in 1953. Their first league honour came in 1959–60, with promotion from Division 2 West to the First Division of the Welsh League. Carmarthen Town's first trophy was the Welsh Football League Cup, which they won in the 1995–96 season. Since then the club have gone on to win the Welsh Cup once and the Welsh League Cup three times. They have also qualified for UEFA competitions on four occasions.

Carmarthen Town currently play in Cymru South and have yet to win a league title, despite having been in the top tier of Welsh football for a 24-year stint until their relegation in the 19–20 season. The club had their highest finish in 2000–01, with third place, which qualified them for European competition for the first time.

Stadium

From 1952 Carmarthen Town have played at Richmond Park in Carmarthen. The ground has been redeveloped over recent years into a small, modern and compact football stadium with a capacity of 3,000. The club's new Clay Shaw Butler Stand has a 1000-seat capacity which enabled Carmarthen Town to host the club's first home European fixture at the ground in July 2007 when they entertained Norwegian side SK Brann.

Supporters
In the 2012–13 season Carmarthen's average attendance was 296, placing them fourth out of twelve teams in the Cymru Premier. The highest league gate of the season came against Afan Lido FC with 413 spectators and the lowest, 167, against Airbus UK Broughton.

Current squad

Club officials

Senior club staff
President: Einsley Harris
Chairman: Chris Edwards
Club Secretary & Football Administrator: Gareth Davies
Press Officer: Rob Lloyd
Social Media accounts: Joshua Edwards
Tuck Shop Manager: Kath Edwards
Bar Manager: Roger Hunt

Coaching and medical staff
Manager: Kristian O’leary
Assistant Manager: Sean Cresser
Coach: Craig Hanford
Sports Therapist: Ryan Evans
KitMan: Mark Hannington

Managerial history
The following managers have each been in charge of Carmarthen Town since the club gained promotion to the highest tier in Welsh football, the Cymru Premier, in 1996.

As of January 2014

Honours

The Welsh Football League
 Welsh second tier (currently Welsh Football League Division One)
Winners (1): 1995–96
 Welsh third tier (currently Welsh Football League Division Two)
Winners (1): 1959–60

Domestic Cup Competition
 Welsh Cup:
Winners (1): 2006–07
Runners-up (2): 1998–99, 2004–05
Cymru Premier Cup:
Winners (3): 2004–05, 2012–13, 2013–14
Runners-up (1):  2003–04
Welsh Football League Cup
Winners (1): 1995–96
West Wales Senior Cup:
Winners (1): 2004
Runners-up (2): 2003, 2006

European Competition
UEFA Cup
Qualification:2005–06, 2007–08
UEFA Intertoto Cup
Qualification: 2001–02, 2006–07

Records

Record wins
Record league win: 9–1 against UWIC Inter Cardiff, 21 October 2000
Record league home win:
9–1 against UWIC Inter Cardiff, 21 October 2000
8–0 against Cardiff Grange Quins, 10 December 2005
8–0 against Connah's Quay Nomads, 8 December 2007
Record league away win: 7–1 against Caersws, 6 October 2006

Record defeats
Record league defeat: 0–8 against The New Saints, 29 March 2009
Record league home defeat:
1–5 against Bangor City, 7 December 1996
0–4 against Aberystwyth Town, 26 February 1997
0–4 against Ton Pentre, 4 September 1996
0–4 against Haverfordwest County, 8 December 2000
Record league away defeat: 8–0 at The New Saints, 29 March 2009

Player records
Most goals in season:
18 by Danny Thomas in 2007–08
18 by Richard Parker in 1999-00
Most goals in match: 5 by Tim Hicks against Connah's Quay Nomads, 8 December 2007
Club top scorer: 56 by Danny Thomas from 116 appearances (+41 substitute appearances)
Most club appearances: 199 (+12 substitute appearance) by Paul Fowler

European record
Record European win: 5–1 against Longford Town, 28 July 2005
Record European defeat: 0–8 against SK Brann, 19 July 2007

Carmarthen Town's scores are given first in all scorelines.

See also
List of Carmarthen Town A.F.C. seasons

References

External links

Official websites
 

 Carmarthen Town at the Cymru Premier official website
 Carmarthen Town at the UEFA official website

News sites
 Carmarthen Town at the unofficial Cymru Premier website

Other
 Carmarthen Town at OpenCorporates

 
Cymru Premier clubs
Sport in Carmarthenshire
Association football clubs established in 1948
1948 establishments in Wales
Football clubs in Wales
Cymru South clubs